The 2020 Bodoland Territorial Council election was held between 7 and 10 December 2020  to elect members to the Bodoland Territorial Council, the autonomous district council for the Bodoland Territorial Region in India. All 40 elected seats in the council were up for election.

Background 
In the previous council, BPF and BJP were in an asymmetric alliance with the BPF as the major partner.  The BJP on the other hand was in power at the state and the center.

Scheduled date and postponement

The elections were due to be held on 4 April 2020 but were postponed due to the global COVID-19 pandemic.

The term of the current council was due to expire on 27 April 2020. There were two possible options for the council after that date, the term of the current council could be extended by up to six months or the Bodoland Territorial Region could be placed under President's rule by the Governor of Assam. On 27 April 2020, it was announced that Bodoland would come under Governor's rule until a new council is elected.

Election schedule 

Elections to 40 seats in Bodoland Territorial council were held in two phases.
Phase 1 (7 Dec 2020) 21 seats in Udalguri and Baksa districts.
Phase 2 (10 Dec 2020) 19 seats in Chirang and Kokrajhar districts.

Election results were announced on 12 December 2020.

Voting

During phase 1, Assam State election Commission puts voting percentage at 77%.

Exit Polls

Results
No party has won a majority in the elections with BPF emerging as the single largest party.

Party summary

Winning candidates

Post-election executive formation
On 13 December, the BJP announced that it has agreed to support efforts by the UPPL to form an executive. The leader of the UPPL, Pramod Boro, became the new Chief Executive Member of the Bodoland Territorial Council on 15 December.

See also
2020 elections in India

References

Bodoland
2020 elections in India
Local elections in Assam
Autonomous district council elections in India